Amtelco is a manufacturer of telecommunications equipment and telephone answering service and call center systems, founded in 1976.

History
Amtelco was founded in 1976 by Bill Curtin in the wake of the 1968 U.S. Federal Communications Commission (FCC) ruling in the Carterphone case, which struck down existing tariffs prohibiting connection to the public telephone network of equipment not supplied by telephone operating companies.

Following the release of its TAS (Telephone Answering Service) Video system, Amtelco became a common name in the telecommunications service industry, its product being one of the first computerized telephone switching system, following the 1ESS switch and one designed by the British GPO Post Office Research Station in the late 1960s and now in the Science Museum in London.

The TAS system soon was succeeded by the EVE system; more powerful and taking advantage of early-model PCs and dumb terminals. By the late 1980s, AMTELCO's EVE (Electronic Video Exchange) system grew to become the most widely used business telephone answering equipment in the industry. Today, Infinity has replaced EVE as the flagship Telephone switching system.

EVE
EVE's best use is with a network on a dumb terminal. Each operator has a log in, with then can be given permission and routed calls based on experience. The screen is separated into 4 parts. The top which states the operator name, whether the operator is turned on for receiving calls or not, the terminal number, and a date time group. Below that is a space that is capable of displaying 3 lines at once, with the ring count, call status, greeting, and what type of call it is. The bottom portion of the screen is split with individual account information contained on the left side, while the area to take a message is located on the right side. The operator must read the information on left side to decide how to dispatch a message, which will include instructions to e-mail, fax, print and snail mail, alpha page/text message, call/patch employees on call, or to even ignore messages from individuals.

EVE is a system that can run 64 serial ports at one time, taking messages for up to 10,000 accts and with only 1 pc strapped to it fax to 8 machines at one time while emailing, paging, and mirroring its scsi drives all while switching 255 live calls. It can run for 6 months at a time without so much as a restart.

References

 Full text of FCC Carterfone decision
 Amtelco Website

External links
 1Call
 RED ALERT
 XDS
 miSecureMessages ( new product)
 miOnCall (new product)

Telecommunications companies of the United States
Companies based in Wisconsin